In time management, gold plating is the phenomenon of working on a project or task past the point of diminishing returns.

Phenomenon
For example: after having met the requirements, the project manager or the developer works on further enhancing the product, thinking the customer will be delighted to see additional or more polished features, rather than what was asked for or expected. The customer might be disappointed in the results, and the extra effort by the developer might be futile.

Gold plating is also considered a bad project management practice for different project management best practices and methodologies such as Project Management Body of Knowledge (PMBOK) and PRINCE2. In this case, 'gold plating' means the addition of any feature not considered in the original scope plan (PMBOK) or product description (PRINCE2) at any point of the project. This is because it introduces a new source of risks to the original planning such as additional testing, documentation, costs, or timelines. However, avoiding gold plating does not prevent new features from being added to the project; they can be added at any time as long as they follow the official change procedure and the impact of the change in all the areas of the project is taken into consideration.

Effects of Gold Plating
Even the best outcomes of gold plating can ultimately lead to negative realities for a project manager or for the project as a whole. In a best-case scenario, the customer accepts the project deliverable with the out-of-scope work, and customer expectations on future projects may forever be elevated to unrealistic levels. In a worst-case scenario, the customer might reject the project deliverable entirely and nullify the contract.

See also 
 Second-system effect
 Scope creep
 Worse is better
 Death march (project management)
 KISS principle
 You aren't gonna need it (YAGNI)

References 

Software project management